Eugene Godsoe (born January 20, 1988) is an American former competition swimmer who specialized in backstroke and butterfly events. At the 2013 World Aquatics Championships, Godsoe placed 2nd in the 50m butterfly.

References

External links
 
 
 Eugene Godsoe – Stanford University athlete profile at GoStanford.com

1988 births
Living people
American male butterfly swimmers
American male backstroke swimmers
Stanford Cardinal men's swimmers
World record holders in swimming
World Aquatics Championships medalists in swimming
Medalists at the FINA World Swimming Championships (25 m)
Pan American Games silver medalists for the United States
Pan American Games medalists in swimming
Swimmers at the 2011 Pan American Games
Swimmers at the 2015 Pan American Games
Sportspeople from Greensboro, North Carolina
Medalists at the 2011 Pan American Games
Medalists at the 2015 Pan American Games